R&R Market is a general merchandise and grocery store in San Luis, Colorado. Built in 1857, it is the oldest continually operating business in the state.

R&R Market is the grocery store in the remote region of San Luis.They support native farmers by selling locally produced products like meat.

History
Dario Gallegos opened R&R Market with $452 in May 1857. The business was established by a family of Spanish conquistadors. The store was originally made of 25-inch adobe bricks which has a foundation of rocks with mud mortar. R&R Market went through an attack by Native Americans in 1858 and two fires in 1895 and 1945 that almost destroyed it. The store's brick walls were eventually reinforced with stucco, concrete, and plaster.The store building is constructed in Territorial Adobe style.

Gallegos's descendants managed R&R Market until it went on sale in 2017.

References

Retail markets in the United States
Retail companies established in 1857
Buildings and structures in Costilla County, Colorado